DJ Smallz is an American hip-hop DJ, known for his Southern Smoke mixtapes as well as his weekly show on Sirius Satellite Radio and DISH Network, Southern Smoke Radio. His tapes have featured such artists as Young Buck, Ludacris, Master P,  Lil Wayne, B.o.B,  Outlawz KO McCoy, Drake, and Juicy J with Project Pat.

Mixtapes
Southern Smoke Radio Pt. 1
Southern Smoke Radio Pt. 2
Southern Smoke Radio Pt. 3
Southern Smoke Radio Pt. 4
Southern Smoke Radio Pt. 5
Southern Smoke Radio Pt. 6
Southern Smoke Radio Pt. 7
Southern Smoke Radio Pt. 8
Southern Smoke Radio Pt. 9
Southern Smoke Radio Pt. 10
2011: This That Southern Smoke!
2012: Southern Smoke Radio Pt. 11
2012: This That Southern Smoke! Vol. 2
2012: This That Southern Smoke! Vol. 3
2013: This That Southern Smoke! Vol. 4
2013: This That Southern Smoke! Vol. 5
2013: This That Southern Smoke! Vol. 7 
2013: This That Southern Smoke! Vol. 8

Hosted mixtapes
2006: Drake - Room for Improvement
2007: B.o.B - Cloud 9
2008: Cash Daddy, MeatSpady, Meek Mill - Streets May Be Icy
2009: Young Buck - Back on My Buck Shit (hosted with DJ Scream)
2009: Diamond - P.M.S.: Pardon My Swag
2009: Ahmad da God - Northern Dope
2013: Young Buck & Tha City Paper - G.a.S – Gangsta and Street 2
2014: Stekaly tha Singer - Panic Disorder the Prequel

References

External links
 DJ Smallz - official site

Southern hip hop musicians
Living people
Year of birth missing (living people)
Mixtape DJs
American hip hop DJs